LUMA Energy is the power company responsible for power distribution and power transmission in the Commonwealth of Puerto Rico. They are also in charge of maintaining and modernizing the power infrastructure. Previously, these duties belonged exclusively (according to the law) to the Puerto Rico Electric Power Authority (PREPA, Spanish Autoridad de Energía Eléctrica, AEE), but as of July 20, 2018, permission was granted for PREPA assets and service duties to be sold to private companies, and on June 22, 2020, a 15-year contract with LUMA was signed, making LUMA the new operator. The takeover took place on June 1, 2021.

History

2020: Company creation and registration 
LUMA Energy was registered in Puerto Rico's Registry of Corporations and Entities on January 17, 2020, under the name LUMA Energy ManageCo, LLC. The name was changed to LUMA Energy, LLC. as of June 12, 2020. The company is a joint venture between Houston company Quanta Services Inc. and Alberta, Canada company ATCO. Both companies have an equal share in LUMA, which was built with the express purpose of managing Puerto Rico's power grid. LUMA Energy is currently presided by CEO Wayne Stensby.

The contract under which LUMA Energy operates the power grid in Puerto Rico was signed after a bid in 2020. In the bid, five different companies participated and only four submitted business proposals. The $1,500M contract is set to last for 15 years and can be renewed if both parties agree.

2021, June: Takeover of the power grid 
LUMA Energy officially became the new operator for Puerto Rico's power grid on June 1, 2021. LUMA is in charge of operating the distribution and transmission infrastructure, although they do not own it, nor do they own or operate the power generation sector. The takeover happened as part of an agreement with Puerto Rico's Public-Private Partnership Agreement in an effort to overcome PREPA's bankruptcy.

Online platform 
As part of the company's takeover, a new online platform was made available. The platform was meant to seamlessly allow the hand-over of online services, including bill payments and outage report submissions. However, the platform failed to work as expected. Soon after, LUMA Energy representative José Pérez spoke on the radio to explain that the web service failures may have been due to excess traffic. The company later claimed that this excess traffic was a result of a DDoS attack, which was pending investigation as of June 10, 2021. The alleged DDoS attack caused upwards of 2 million visits per second to the web service pages, causing them to malfunction and the service to be unavailable to legitimate users. If confirmed, this cyberattack is one in a string of cyberattacks targeting infrastructure operators in the several months preceding July 2021 that prompted the White House to alert private-sector companies to update their cybersecurity defenses.

Power outage crisis 
After the company's takeover, the island suffered widespread power outages, though problems existed before the takeover. As a consequence, several mayors declared an official emergency in their respective municipalities. According to LUMA Energy, the power outages are due to a variety of reasons, including existing damage to the power grid, bad weather, and possibly even sabotage. LUMA Energy claimed that the number of clients without service was at an all-time low, but Daily News reports up to 1 million customers suffered blackouts in June 2021, excluding the June 10 Monacillos fire. The consequences of the power outage crisis extend as far as to cause more than 13,000 PRASA clients to be without water service due to power outages at the water plants.  This number increased to about 40,000 after the Monacillos fire on June 10, 2021. Additionally, on July 3, 2021, a power outage caused La Plata water dam to go offline, leaving over 250,000 PRASA clients without water service. Meanwhile, the Association of Hospitals (Spanish: Asociación de Hospitales) warned on June 17, 2021, that the power outages put patients' lives at risk and that the power outage crisis needed to be solved immediately, regardless of what the cause was.

On Wednesday, June 16, 2021, a massive power outage left more than 337,000 clients without electricity after three units went offline unexpectedly. The reason for the units' failure is unknown as of June 17, 2021. Hours prior to the incident, LUMA Energy had stated it would be selectively shutting down systems to give them maintenance and due to insufficient power generation capacity, but that this sudden outage was unrelated and not intentional.

On Monday, June 21, 2021, a problem with unit #5 in Central de San Juan power generation station caused a power relay to leave 45,349 without electrical service, most of them in the Ponce area.

The power outage crisis caused one of the island's major shopping centers, Plaza del Caribe in Ponce, to close on June 22, 2021, due to a blackout.

2021, June 10: Monacillos fire 
On the afternoon of June 10, 2021, an explosion followed by a fire occurred at Monacillos Substation. The fire originated at a transformer that blew, and it caused damage to the power grid across different regions of the island. No injuries or deaths occurred in association with the fire. According to user reports on social media, power outages extend to the municipalities of San Juan, Trujillo Alto, Dorado, Vega Alta, Carolina, Bayamón, Fajardo, Toa Alta, Loíza, Caguas, Culebra, Guaynabo, Naranjito, and Canóvanas, among others. Included in the clients with no service as a result of the fires was El Capitolio. According to UTIER's president, Ángel Figueroa Jaramillo, an estimated 50% or more of the island was left in a blackout as a result of the fire. Later reports state that approximately 900,000 clients were without power at the height of the blackout, and that by midnight on that same night, this number was closer to 60,000. By the morning of Friday, June 11, 2021, approximately 36,000 were still without power. According to Puerto Rico's Secretary of Health, Carlos Mellado López, the blackout did not jeopardize vaccination efforts against COVID-19 since there are power generators available for keeping the vaccines frozen.

Investigation of the incident 
The incident was reported to local and federal authorities, including the Federal Bureau of Investigation in San Juan, to determine if a crime is associated with the situation. Initially, it was unclear whether the fire was due to sabotage and no immediate connection between the fire and the alleged DDoS attacks had been established. On June 12, 2021, as indicated via Tweet by David Begnaud (CBS) and confirmed via press conference by Secretary of Public Safety of Puerto Rico Alexis Torres, preliminary investigation suggested the fire was due to an accident and not foul play. Authorities did not confirm or deny these reports, however, and at the time very little information about the investigation was publicly available "due to FBI policy.".

As part of granting approval for the investigation, a resolution by the Puerto Rico Bureau of Energy (Negociado de Energía de Puerto Rico, NEPR) required LUMA to provide NEPR with information regarding the progress of the investigation. The deadline for this update was the afternoon of June 14, 2021, and the information shared was to be made public (censoring sensitive data). However, as of June 17, 2021, this information has not been released and the cause for the fire remains speculative. Per LUMA Energy's contract, NEPR is responsible for overseeing its operations and acting as the company's regulator.

Final determination of cause 
On June 30, 2021, Secretary of Public Safety of Puerto Rico, Alexis Torres, informed that the investigation of the Monacillos fire had determined the cause was accidental. No criminal activity was associated with the fire, and it was instead due to an alleged lack of equipment maintenance. Out of nine transformers, transformers 4, 5, and 6 were the most damaged. The fire is believed to have started at transformer 5. The investigation report states that the FBI and LUMA Energy engineers continue to investigate the incident, and that the determination of no criminal hand is subject to change should additional findings suggest otherwise.

Backlash, controversy and protests

Contract controversy 
The contract signed between LUMA Energy and the Puerto Rican government is surrounded by controversy due to lack of transparency – the contract was signed behind closed doors and announced only after the fact, meaning the citizens of the island had no say in it. UTIER lawyer and legal representative Rolando Emmanuelli Jiménez stated, at the time that the contract was made public, that "its reach far extends beyond that which Fortaleza has led the nation to believe." The contract granted LUMA Energy control over distribution and transmission infrastructure, customer service, and administrative divisions such as human resources, and budgeting and finance, essentially making the company owner of a monopolized service. Emmanuelli Jiménez also noted that the contract allows LUMA Energy to dissolve the agreement for a variety of reasons, as long as a 120-day notice is provided before the effective date, which he deems too short a time. Among the possible reasons for contract dissolution are included: natural disasters, war and armed conflict, sabotage (both online and offline), civil disobedience, epidemics, insurrection, and acts of terror.

Another point of controversy was LUMA Energy's request to be freed from liability in a wide variety of situations. The approval of this request would have meant the company would not be held liable legally in the event of damages, including death, due to negligence or willful ill-intent. However, the request was denied by the NEPR, who opted instead for a liability clause similar to what was in place for PREPA. PREPA's clause was not as extensive in waiving liability as LUMA's denied clause attempted to be. The associated costs for the liabilities PREPA (and now LUMA) incurred were covered by insurance, which the Independent Office of Consumer Protection (Spanish: Oficina Independiente de Protección del Consumidor, OIPC) argued was what LUMA should do instead. When questioned by the press, LUMA Energy president Wayne Stensby claimed the request for limitation of liability was submitted with the intent of preventing customers from having to assume additional costs, and not for the company's own protection.

The controversy also extends to the company itself. The company is a new consortium which was only formally registered in the island in January 2020, about 5 months prior to the contract being signed. However, Stensby stated that the company is experienced and that ATCO and Quanta have already worked together to operate the power grid in Alberta, Canada.

Sabotage allegations 
LUMA Energy employees reported instances of sabotage and vandalism, and the company has hinted at sabotage publicly, though not directly. Representative Jorge Navarro expressed urgency in investigating the sabotage allegations connected to the power outage crisis and prosecuting perpetrators if anyone was found to be responsible for the power outages. LUMA Energy also cited a DDoS attack as reason for its web services malfunctioning. more recent substation fire have been video taped and posted to YouTube.com and original uploader saw it as an act of sabotage.

On June 15, 2021, LUMA Energy alerted citizens that scam callers and emailers were allegedly contacting clients posing as LUMA employees and claiming to be calling with the purpose of making collections.

Widespread protests 
Following the announcement of the company's takeover and the act itself, multiple protests occurred across the island and the company has been heavily scrutinized. Protestors included former workers, trade union UTIER, allied groups such as the Path of Truth Collective (Spanish: Colectivo Ruta de la Verdad), Association of PREPA Jubilees (AJAEE, for Spanish Asociación de Jubilados de la Autoridad de Energía Eléctrica), and the general public. In some instances, protestors blocked entry into LUMA premises. On June 2, 2021, as a result of blocked access into premises, LUMA sued UTIER, UTIER president Ángel Figueroa Jaramillo, and AJAEE. In the legal action, LUMA requested UTIER "cease and desist any acts of intimidation, violence, vandalism, or that impedes the use of property or disturbs the senses in violation of constitutional rights." According to LUMA, this was not in an effort to silence protests, but "as an invitation" for protestors to "take control of their actions while exercising their right to protest." In response, a court order was emitted on June 4, 2021, stating that for the next 10 days, UTIER protestors could not "block access to facilities used by LUMA Energy to provide electrical service on the island", with the caveat that the right to freedom of speech not be limited. The court order adds that protestors may not block roadways leading to facilities, and that protestors are to abstain from acts of violence, vandalism, or disturbing of peace that concretely affect LUMA Energy's ability to work. However, since LUMA Energy failed to demonstrate ill action from AJAEE, the court order only affects UTIER and UTIER president Ángel Figueroa Jaramillo, or anyone in representation of these entities. The court order was also emitted without legal representation being present on behalf of UTIER or Figueroa Jaramillo. On June 18, 2021, superior court judge Alfonso S. Martínez Piovanetti closed the case due to "insufficient evidence" and "no-longer existing controversy." Ongoing protest proceed in Ponce, San Gurmaine, San Juan, and all other luma employment sites with, Luma employees physically being blocked in by protesters.

Electrical hazards and damage 
The power outage crisis since LUMA's takeover on June 1, 2021, caused customers to complain about more than just blackouts. A common complaint was voltage irregularities in the supplied power, causing power surges and damaging electric appliances.

The irregularities in supplied power are linked to the fires in two San Sebastián residences. No injuries were associated with the event, but the occupants were evacuated and LUMA was contacted to repair the burnt power meters.

Rise in electricity cost 
The privatization of Puerto Rico's power grid represents a potential increase in cost for clients, despite rates already having been set to increase as a means to offset the island's debt. Puerto Ricans use, on average, less electricity than citizens in other states of the US, but pay about twice as much for the service. An increase in costs is concerning because the island's economy is declining and poverty rates in the island are significantly higher than the national average.

An increase in electric utility costs could also mean a rise in water utility costs. The dams are owned by PREPA and used as hydroelectric facilities. The water is then given cost-free to PRASA for processing. If LUMA were to acquire the facilities, some people are concerned that they could name a cost for the water and force PRASA to buy it.

The Puerto Rico Energy Bureau (NEPR) approved a 7.6% rate increase effective July 1, 2021 through September 30, 2021. After revision on September 30, 2021 the rate was further increased by 3% effective October through December. This increase marked the fourth rate increase of the year.

The Puerto Rico Energy Bureau later approved yet another rate increase on December 30, 2021. LUMA Energy had initially proposed a rate increase of 4.05 cents (18.4%), but the rate increase that was authorized by the Puerto Rico Energy Bureau was of 3.67 cents (16.8%) higher than the prior rate. This rate increase took effect for the first trimester of 2022.

Renewable energy 
One concern protestors had was whether LUMA Energy planned to continue using the existing grid and generation model. Advocates for a distributed grid questioned whether keeping the centralized model was reasonable. LUMA president Stensby responded to this by saying that the company seeks to upgrade the power grid to include renewable energy sources, such as wind and solar power. As of November 2020, only 2.5% of the island's power comes from renewable sources.

Service insufficiency 
A common complaint among Puerto Ricans in the face of the company's takeover was that the company was insufficiently staffed and inappropriately prepared. There were reports of 3-hour waits on the phone to receive service, insufficient brigades and long delays to service power lines, and broken web service platforms. LUMA Energy representative, José Pérez, spoke on the radio soon after the complaints began to say that the power outages could potentially be a result of sabotage. Statistics from the first three months of operation show LUMA restored power to customers in an average of 333 minutes, compared to 155 under PREPA for the same three months in 2020, and the U.S. overall average of 82 minutes.

Due to the insufficient brigades and lack of reliable service, the mayors of Barceloneta, Isabela, San Lorenzo, and Trujillo Alto municipalities declared a state of emergency in their municipalities during June 2021. They also activated their own brigades, hired independently of LUMA, to perform necessary repairs to restore electrical service. The state of emergency designation allows mayors to use available funding to repair the power grid and hire private contractors as-needed. Some mayors also used this designation to provide citizens with emergency relief for food and medication spoiled due to damaged appliances. Barceloneta mayor Wanda Soler Rosario stated that "for any one person to be without power service this long is unacceptable and worrying."

A news report from June 21, 2021, states that Popular Democratic Party (Spanish: Partido Popular Democrático, PPD) representative Luis Raúl Torres denounced LUMA Energy's insufficient staffing. He requested that governor Pedro Pierluisi, who had previously asked people to "give LUMA some time", and the Public-Private Partnership Authority (Spanish: Autoridad de Alianzas Público-Privadas, AAPP) set a 30-day deadline for LUMA to correct deficiencies that, according to Torres, result in a breach of contract, and to cancel the contract if this issue is not resolved. Regarding the amount of necessary employees, Wayne Stensby (CEO and president of LUMA) had stated before that around 3,800 employees were needed, but that the company only has 2,200 on its payroll.

On June 24, 2021, representative Jorge Navarro Suárez denounced that "LUMA Energy has failed." He claimed that LUMA "incurred crass negligence because they had sufficient time to prepare." He assured that LUMA Energy would be sanctioned if it was found that the company wasn't keeping their contractual obligations.

Regarding the wait times for phone service, LUMA stated on July 2, 2021, that they had a total of 115 call center employees and subcontracts with 3 companies (30, 70, and 85 employees respectively) to handle calls. They also claimed that in August 2021 they expected to have around 580 employees for their call centers, with the goal of reducing call wait times to less than 5 minutes. According to LUMA Energy, they receive between 7,000 and 15,000 calls per day.

LUMA Energy had also been receiving complaints about estimated bills. In response to this, on June 25, 2021, they asked clients to submit photographs of their power meter readings so that their bills could be adjusted accordingly, rather than the company having to send out employees to do the readings as was standard procedure. Later on, the company stated that they had plans to update the electrical meters so that most (if not all) readings could be taken remotely rather than being performed manually.

Severe weather 
Another common concern among protestors is LUMA's preparedness for severe weather. Puerto Rico is a tropical island in the Caribbean, meaning it is located in a region that is vulnerable to tropical storms and hurricanes. After Hurricane María in 2017, which caused year-long blackouts and seriously weakened the power grid, protestors worry that LUMA's takeover could be ill-timed (taking place in June, at the beginning of hurricane season) and that the power grid and its workers would be ill-prepared for an event of that magnitude. This is another reason for the push towards renewable energy and a distributed grid model, which has been deemed incompatible with privatization of the utility.

Workers' rights 
PREPA workers protested the takeover citing concerns over their rights. One of their main concerns was job security, since the contract with LUMA would force them to reapply for their job under the new company. Workers were concerned that they would be forced to work for other agencies and the company would favor new, inexperienced hires from their companies in the United States, Canada, and Puerto Rico, and that this would be happening at a critical time since June is the beginning of the Atlantic hurricane season. The UTIER, a local trade union, claimed that the contract potentially violates local labor laws. Workers not hired by LUMA were set to become public workers in other agencies, which was in itself a concern due to uncertainty regarding availability of funding for their salaries. Workers were also concerned about their retirement funds.

On June 14, 2021, LUMA Energy confirmed via press release that UITICE (Insular Union of Industrial Workers and Electrical Constructions, Spanish: Unión Insular de Trabajadores Industriales y Construcciones Eléctricas) would exclusively be the new trade union representing LUMA electricity workers. UTIER president Ángel Figueroa Jaramillo reacted to this saying that the process was not democratic because no elections were held, leaving the choice at the hands of LUMA Energy only, and that it represented "a clear conspiracy between LUMA Energy and UITICE president Héctor Reyes against protecting workers' rights." Figueroa Jaramillo expressed concerns over whether or not this could mean that UITICE would be unable to properly oversee LUMA Energy and protect workers' rights due to potential conflict of interest with the company. He also reassured workers that UTIER "is still alive and will be creating an organization to group former AEE employees that have moved to other agencies", and that they plan to keep fighting the LUMA contract "that would raise energy rates and provide no power grid improvements, as demonstrated."

References 

Electric power companies of Puerto Rico
American companies established in 2020